Better Serbia (BS) is a national-conservative political party in Serbia. Its leader is Dragan Jovanović, a former member of New Serbia. It is the main governing party in the municipality of Topola.

Origins and current status 
Jovanović was a longtime member of New Serbia (NS) before his expulsion from the party in January 2017, which occurred against the backdrop of a quarrel with party leader Velimir Ilić. Jovanović was elected on Serbian Progressive Party's (SNS) list in 2016, and after serving as an independent member of the assembly for six months, Jovanović launched Better Serbia in July 2017. A month before the formation, Jovanović presented a political program with Vladan Glišić and Miroslav Parović. He outlined the party's positions in an interview with Politika shortly thereafter, noting the party's focus on agrarian issues. Jovanović was a supporter of Serbian president Aleksandar Vučić at the time of Better Serbia's establishment, although by 2020 he had become an opponent of the administration.

Better Serbia contested the 2020 Serbian parliamentary election in an alliance with Healthy Serbia. Their list did not cross the electoral threshold to win representation in the assembly. Better Serbia won a narrow victory in Jovanović's home community of Topola in the concurrent 2020 Serbian local elections, defeating the Serbian Progressive Party by sixteen seats to fifteen. After the election, the Progressives formed a new governing alliance with smaller parties in the local assembly, and Better Serbia served in opposition. In April 2021, however, two defectors from the Progressives allowed Better Serbia to form a new municipal administration with the support from the Movement for the Restoration of the Kingdom of Serbia. Topola's incumbent mayor, Ivan Petrović, also chose to join the new administration.

On 14 February 2022, Dragan Jovanović announced that BS will participate in the 2022 Serbian parliamentary elections as part of the SNS-led coalition and their "Together We Can Do Everything" ballot list.

Presidents of Better Serbia

Electoral performance

Parliamentary elections

Presidential elections

See also 

 List of political parties in Serbia

References

Political parties established in 2017
National conservative parties
Agrarian parties in Serbia
Conservative parties in Serbia
Right-wing parties in Europe
Nationalist parties in Serbia
Serb nationalist parties